Windsor Castle was a wooden-hulled, three-masted sailing ship that was built in England in 1857 and wrecked off the coast of Cape Colony in 1884.

Building
William Pile built Windsor Castle in his North Shore shipyard in Sunderland, launching her on 12 March 1857 and completing her that May.

The ship was built for Richard Green, who registered her in London. Her United Kingdom official number was 15822 and her code letters were LTVQ.

Career

Windsor Castle sailed between England and Australia. The Queensland Migrant Shipping records show her carrying passengers between 1877 and 1881.

In 1876 Captain N Harrison was Windsor Castles Master.

After she was extensively overhauled in July 1882, the government sometimes chartered the ship to transport troops to Zanzibar and Sydney.

In 1882 Elias Cox of Bridport, Dorset bought Windsor Castle. According to Lloyd's Register she remained registered in London, but according to the Mercantile Navy List she was re-registered in Bridport.

In 1884 Windsor Castle was sailing from Cochin to London when a cyclone on 27–28 June washed the third officer overboard and swept away her rudder. She drifted for the next 12 days. The Norwegian barque Ophir rescued the crew.

References

1857 ships
Clippers
Full-rigged ships
Individual sailing vessels
Maritime incidents in July 1884
Merchant ships of the United Kingdom
Migrant ships to Australia
Sailing ships of the United Kingdom
Shipwrecks of the South African Indian Ocean coast